TV Educativa do Rio de Janeiro (also called as TVE Brasil or TVE RJ) was a major Brazilian public TV network based in Rio de Janeiro, now defunct. It was founded in November 5, 1975 and ended on December 2, 2007, being replaced by TV Brasil, the Brazilian federal government channel.

TVE Brazil coordinated with TV Cultura and other regional public stations a nationwide public television network. For many years, TVE Brazil was fairly well watched amongst Brazilians, with some 16 million viewers reported. Until the beginning of the 1990, TVE Brazil was under the supervision of the Brazilian Ministry of Education. Until 2007, each medium was administered alone, there was no central body and every public station operated separately.

Without a well-defined communication policy, successive changes in the presidency and total lack of fiscal responsibility by the directors, the Roquette Pinto Foundation went into bankruptcy with debts over R$ 34 million (equivalent to US$ 6 million in 2021 amounts). The federal government radically changed the way they operated in 1998 and founded ACERP (Roquette Pinto Educational Communication Association), as a non-profit organization, taking its staff, assets and concessions. In 2007, it was replaced by the Brazil Communication Company (EBC), which was linked to the Ministry of Social Communication of the Brazilian Government and ceased operations. The channel was replaced by TV Brasil.

Former programming

Arte com Sérgio Britto
Atitude.com
Atitude no Telhado
Acervo MPB
Caderno 2
Código de Barras
Comentário Geral
Curta Brasil
Cadernos de Cinema
Espaço Público
Esportvisão
A Grande Música
Jornal Visual
Notícias do Rio
Edição Nacional (com a Rede Manchete)
Observatório da Imprensa
Plugado
Programa Especial
Recorte Cultural
Revista do Cinema Brasileiro
Sem Censura
Stadium
Tribunal do Povo
100% Brasil
Um Menino muito Maluquinho
Clifford the Big Red Dog
Jay Jay the Jet Plane

References

Television networks in Brazil
1975 establishments in Brazil
Defunct television networks
Educational and instructional television channels
Television channels and stations established in 1975
Television channels and stations disestablished in 2007
Mass media in Rio de Janeiro (city)
2007 disestablishments in Brazil
Empresa Brasil de Comunicação